The Inland Empire–Orange County (IEOC) Line is a commuter rail line run by Metrolink in Southern California. It runs from San Bernardino through Orange County to Oceanside in northern San Diego County. When the line opened it became the first Metrolink line not to serve Union Station in Los Angeles nor cross the Los Angeles River and was the only line until the Arrow Commuter Rail opened in October 2022.

The IEOC Line, Metrolink's sixth line to be introduced, opened between Riverside and Irvine on October 2, 1995. Following the completion of track improvements the line opened to San Bernardino on March 4, 1996. With the exception of the Anaheim Canyon station, the line shares all of its stations with the 91 Line, the Orange County Line, the Riverside Line, or the San Bernardino Line.

As of July 2016, eight trains in each direction serve the stations from San Bernardino - Downtown to Laguna Niguel/Mission Viejo on weekdays. The remainder of the trains servicing the IEOC Line cover more to all of the stations, except San Clemente Pier, which is only serviced on the weekends.

In July 2006, the Orange County Transportation Authority created weekend service on the IEOC and Orange County Lines. As of August 2016, the IEOC Line schedule has two trains on Saturday and two on Sunday, each servicing every station, including San Clemente Pier.

Metrolink's Downtown San Bernardino extension to San Bernardino Transit Center opened on December 16, 2017.

Stations

References

External links

Metrolink Schedules

Metrolink (California) lines
Public transportation in Orange County, California
Public transportation in Riverside County, California
Public transportation in San Bernardino County, California
Public transportation in San Diego County, California
Public transportation in Southern California
Orange County Transportation Authority
Railway lines opened in 1995
Transportation in the Inland Empire
Transportation in Riverside, California
Transportation in San Bernardino, California
1995 establishments in California